Vsevolod Apollonovych Balytsky (27 November 1892 – 27 November 1937) was a Soviet official, Commissar of State Security 1st Class (equivalent to Four-star General) of the NKVD and a member of the Central Committee of the Communist Party of the Soviet Union.

Balytsky was born in Verkhnodniprovsk, Yekaterinoslav Governorate in to the family of a Ukrainian clerk. Initially a Menshevik, he joined the Bolshevik Party in 1915.

He directed the NKVD of Ukraine during the Great Famine. He blamed the famine on sabotage by the Polish Military Organization and its Ukrainian collaborators; in reality, the Polish Military Organization had been dissolved in 1921 after the Polish–Soviet War, and the remaining Polish spies in Soviet Ukraine were uninvolved in the famine. This story was used as a pretext for the NKVD's deportation of many ethnic Poles from eastern Ukraine to Kazakhstan in the summer of 1936. In 1937, NKVD chief Nikolay Yezhov used it as a pretext first for a purge of Poles from the NKVD and then for a broader ethnic cleansing of Poles in the Soviet Union; he attacked Balytsky for not being vigilant enough against the supposed threat of the Polish Military Organization.

On 11 May 1937, Balytsky was transferred to the Far East, becoming Commander of the NKVD; his deputy, Izrail Leplevsky, replaced him as leader of the Ukrainian NKVD.

During the Great Purge he was arrested on 7 July 1937, on charges of spying for Poland. Later, on 27 November 1937 — his 45th birthday — he was sentenced to death and shot the same day in Moscow, then buried at Kommunarka.

References

External links 
The information in this article is based on that in its Ukrainian, Russian and French equivalents.
Shapoval, Y. Truth of details. Mirror Weekly. 17 August 2012

1892 births
1937 deaths
Cheka officers
People from Verkhnodniprovsk
People from Verkhnedneprovsky Uyezd
Central Committee of the Communist Party of the Soviet Union members
Soviet interior ministers of Ukraine
Republican Cheka (Ukraine) chairmen
Commissars 1st Class of State Security
Politburo of the Central Committee of the Communist Party of Ukraine (Soviet Union) members
Recipients of the Order of the Red Banner
Expelled members of the Communist Party of the Soviet Union
Great Purge victims from Ukraine
People executed for treason against the Soviet Union
Members of the Communist Party of the Soviet Union executed by the Soviet Union
People executed by the Soviet Union by firing squad
NKVD officers